The Kamov Ka-10 (NATO reporting name Hat) was a Soviet single-seat observation helicopter that first flew in 1949.

Design and development
The Ka 10 was a development of Nikolay Kamov's earlier Ka-8, which had been successful enough to allow Kamov to set up his own OKB (design bureau) in 1948. The Ka-10 was of similar layout to the Ka-8, with an open steel-tube structure carrying an engine, a pilot's seat and two three-bladed coaxial rotors. It was larger, however, with a revised transmission and rotor hub design, and a new engine specially designed for the helicopter, the  Ivchenko AI-4 flat-four.

Operational history
The Ka-10 made its maiden flight in September 1949. Three more prototypes followed, which were evaluated by Soviet Naval Aviation. A Ka-10 was displayed at the 1950 Tushino Air Display, and one made the first landing by a Soviet helicopter on the deck of a ship on 7 December 1950.

In 1954, 12 of an improved version, the Ka-10M were built for the Maritime Border Troops. They had a twin tail rather than the single vertical fin of the Ka-10 and modified rotors and control systems.

Variants
 Ka-10 : Single-seat observation helicopter.
 Ka-10M : Improved version fitted with twin tailfins and rudders.

Operators

Soviet Navy

Specifications

References

Notes

Bibliography

 Alexander, Jean. Russian Aircraft since 1940. London: Purnell Book Services, 1975. .
 Apostolo, Giorgio. The Illustrated Encyclopedia of Helicopters. New York: Bonanza Books, 1984.  .
 Gunston, Bill. The Osprey Encyclopedia of Russian Aircraft 1875–1995. London: Osprey, 1995. .

Kamov aircraft
1940s Soviet military reconnaissance aircraft
Kamov Ka-010
Coaxial rotor helicopters
Aircraft first flown in 1949
Single-engined piston helicopters